Ante Sundaraniki! is a 2022 Indian Telugu-language romantic comedy film written and directed by Vivek Athreya. Produced by Mythri Movie Makers, it stars Nani and Nazriya Nazim (in her Telugu debut). The film tells the story of Sundar and Leela, an interfaith couple who try to convince their parents about their marriage through a string of lies only to find themselves in more complicated situations. 

The film was announced in November 2020 with principal photography taking place between April 2021 and January 2022. The film was predominantly shot in Hyderabad and the United States. Ante Sundaraniki! was released in cinemas on 10 June 2022 and opened to positive reviews from critics. The film grossed over  crore at the domestic box office and also grossed over 1 million dollars overseas, making it Nani's seventh film to do so.Despite receiving positive reviews, the film failed at the box office and ended up as a below-average grosser.

Plot
Sundar comes from an orthodox Brahmin family. During his childhood, Sundar is duped by a fraudster who promises him a role in an upcoming film starring Chiranjeevi that would be filmed in the US. Therefore, his family develops deep skepticism towards such ventures. Sundar grows up to be an employee at an ad agency. He tries to persuade his colleague Soumya to give up the opportunity to go to the US so that he can take her place and fulfill his dream. But on Soumya's insistence, he tells her the actual reason. Sundar is in love with his childhood sweetheart Leela, a Christian who is now a professional photographer. She gets close to Sundar when her ex-boyfriend Vamsi cheats on her. Sundar and Leela decide to marry but since they belong to different religions, Sundar sketches a plan to convince their parents. As a part of it, they lie to their families about the reason they are leaving for the US. Soumya is convinced and lets Sundar take her place by lying to their manager.

A month after arriving in the US, Sundar lies to his parents that he has Azoospermia but Leela is ready to marry him despite this while Leela lies to her parents that she is pregnant with Sundar's child. They return to India immediately on their parents' demand but Sundar and Leela's bags are exchanged. Sundar's father gathers their relatives to tell them about Sundar's impotency but they come across Leela's bag which raises suspicion. Leela's parents also recognize that her boyfriend is Hindu by looking at a Hanuman sticker on Sundar's bag. They force her to take a pregnancy test which Leela fudges to be positive using a bottle of Mountain Dew.

Sundar's father takes him to several doctors for treatment, all of whom rebuke him after listening to his deception, until they meet Dr. Guru, Sundar's childhood friend. Guru lies that it may take 10–15 years to treat Sundar. Meanwhile, Leela's parents arrange her marriage with Joseph, a family friend, who accepts Leela's pregnancy. Sundar tries to talk Joseph out of it but in vain. Intimidated by Joseph, Sundar reveals that Leela being pregnant is a lie. Joseph informs the same to Leela's parents. He asks Leela to tell the truth by swearing on The Bible but Leela's father calls off her wedding as he doesn't want an outsider to suspect his daughter. With no option left, both their families reluctantly accept Leela and Sundar's marriage while both remain unaware of the other family's reason to do so. During their meeting, the parents come very close to discovering the contradicting stories, but Sundar's parents help in treating the pregnancy cramps of Leela's sister Pushpa, thus bringing their families closer.

Sometime later, Joseph reveals to Leela's mother that it was Sundar who told him that Leela isn't pregnant. She takes Leela to the hospital and gets her pregnancy checked, and to Leela's surprise, the result turns out to be positive. Sundar and Leela are confused about the result as they have not consummated their relationship. They go for another check-up for second opinion. The doctor tells that Leela has dysgerminoma, a type of ovarian cancer which often results in false positives for pregnancy test. The tumour has to be surgically removed from her ovaries following which Leela might not bear children. Sundar confesses to Leela's father that they lied about her pregnancy all along.

Sundar's father and grandmother now want to call off the marriage citing Leela's issue. However, Sundar's mother exposes their hypocrisy as they were ready to marry off Sundar despite his perceived impotency. She feels that Sundar's happiness is more important than their traditions and having children. Sundar's grandmother approves of the marriage by playing the Veena which she gave up post Sundar's childhood fiasco. Delighted, Sundar runs to meet Leela who has undergone the surgery and they decide to get married.

They reach Amelia Island for the wedding to fulfill Leela's wish. Sundar confesses that the anonymous postcard which Leela received in her childhood was sent by him while Leela reveals that she knows it was Sundar who sent the postcard and admits that her dream to have her wedding on Amelia Island was just a made-up story.

Cast

Production

Development 
The film was launched under the tentative title Nani#28. On 21 November 2020, the film's official title was revealed to be Ante Sundaraniki. The film marks the debut of actress Nazriya Nazim in Telugu cinema.

Filming 
Principal photography of the film began on 16 April 2021. Filming wrapped up on 23 January 2022.

Music

The film score and soundtrack album of the film is composed by Vivek Sagar. The music rights were acquired by Saregama.

Background score

Release

Theatrical
The film released theatrically on 10 June 2022. It was announced in January 2022 that the film was going to be released in the summer of 2022. In February 2022, the makers announced that they would release the film in any of seven dates starting from 22 April 2022 to 10 June 2022. In the same month, the makers announced the film's release date as 10 June 2022. Apart from the original version, the film was also dubbed in Tamil under the title Adade Sundara and in Malayalam under the title Aha Sundara.

The film's theatrical rights were sold at  crore.

Home media
The digital streaming rights of the film is owned by Netflix. The film was streamed on Netflix on 8 July 2022 in Telugu and dubbed versions of Tamil and Malayalam languages.

Reception

Critical reception
Ante Sundaraniki received positive reviews from critics. Manoj Kumar R of The Indian Express rated the film 4 out of 5 stars and wrote "Nani effortlessly fits into the role of a rebellious man, who comes up with masterful lies as easy as he breathes. Nazriya Fahadh's screen presence adds a lot to the appeal of the movie". Siby Jeyya of India Herald rated the film 4 out of 5 stars and wrote "Director Vivek took a story of interfaith marriage, adding comedy rooted in mindlessly following religious customs, and drama rooted in striving to achieve a balance between family and love". Critic Latha Srinivasan wrote in Firstpost that Nani and Nazriya shone in this romantic comedy cum family drama and gave it 3 stars on 5. She wrote, "The director has packed a lot of depth into the film."
Neeshita Nyayapati of The Times of India rated the film 3.5 out of 5 stars and wrote "Ante Sundaraniki is at its best when the stellar cast are mouthing off one-liners that are not just relatable but hilarious. Nani shines in the role of Sundar that's right down his alley while Nazriya fits right into the skin of Leela". A critic for Sakshi Post rated the film 3 out of 5 stars and wrote "Ante Sundarainki is an out and out family entertainer and tailor-made film for Nani fans".

Sowmya Rajendran of The News Minute rated the film 3 out of 5 stars and wrote "The film has good performances by the cast and is fun in parts, but the convoluted plot and lengthy runtime test your patience". Janani K of India Today rated the film 3 out of 5 stars and wrote "Ante Sundaraniki is a film that relies on top-notch performances and interesting sequences". Murali Krishna CH of Cinema Express rated the film 2.5 out of 5 stars and wrote "The film has some good moments, some genuinely funny lines and first-rate performances. Compared to the recent rom-coms, this film is worth giving a shot".

Box office
Ante Sundaraniki grossed  crore worldwide on its opening day, including  crore from Andhra Pradesh and Telangana, and $438,000 ( crore) from the United States. The film grossed  crore in its first weekend. In its first week, the film grossed over  crore worldwide with a distributor's share of  crore. Ante Sundaraniki  grossed over $1 million in the United States, making it Nani's seventh film to do so.

As of 2022, Ante Sundaraniki grossed over  crore at the box office but ended up as a commercial success domestically.

Notes

References

External links 
 

Mythri Movie Makers films
2022 romantic comedy films
2020s Telugu-language films
Indian romantic comedy films
Films shot in Hyderabad, India
Films set in the United States
Films set in Kerala